Cyathochromis obliquidens is a species of cichlid endemic to Lake Malawi in east Africa where it is found in shallow, vegetated waters from  depth.  It is an algae grazer, mainly from the leaves of aquatic vegetation.  This species grows to a length of  TL.  It is also found in the aquarium trade.  It currently is the only known member of its genus.

References

Haplochromini
Fish of Lake Malawi
Monotypic fish genera
Taxa named by Ethelwynn Trewavas
Taxonomy articles created by Polbot
Fish described in 1935